
Xerxes is a male name. It is the Greek version of the Old Persian name Xšaya-ṛšā, which is today known in Modern Persian as Khashayar.

Notable people with the name include:

People

Ancient
 Xerxes I of Persia, reigned 486–465 BC
 Xerxes II of Persia, reigned 424 BC
 Xerxes of Sophene, ruler of Sophene and Commagene, 228–201 BC
 Xerxes (Sasanian prince), 6th-century prince and general

Other
 Xerxes Desai (died 2016), Indian businessman
 Xerxes de Oliveira, Brazilian drum and bass producer also known as XRS, XRS Land, Friendtornik and Kapitel 06

Fictional characters
Xerxes, character in Disney's Aladdin
XERXES, an Artificial intelligence in the video game System Shock 2
Xerxes Khodaiji, the protagonist of the film Little Zizou
Xerxes Break, a character in Pandora Hearts
Xerxes, the primary antagonist in D-Yikes!, an episode of South Park
Xerxes, character in Call Girl (Family Guy)
Xerxes IX, a character in the game Neko Atsume